Adam Brown (3 April 1826 – 16 January 1926) was a Canadian merchant and politician. Born in Edinburgh, Scotland, he was a member of the House of Commons of Canada representing Hamilton, Ontario from 1887 to 1891. He died in Hamilton, Ontario.

External links
Adam Brown's entry in the Quebec History Encyclopedia

1826 births
1926 deaths
Conservative Party of Canada (1867–1942) MPs
Members of the House of Commons of Canada from Ontario